WMGM (103.7 FM) is a radio station licensed to Atlantic City, New Jersey, playing active rock.  WMGM serves most of southern New Jersey from Toms River to Cape May.  Its studios are in Linwood, New Jersey, and its transmitter is in Pleasantville, New Jersey.

History

103.7 first signed on with 2,800 watts on June 14, 1961 as WOSJ, later as WMGM. The 1960s were simulcasts of WOND, and good music, then home-made Top 40 tapes. Power was increased to 20,000 watts in stereo in 1972, live daytime and  recorded overnights DJs Jim Earle (also program director)  Steve Bryant (later of QVC and Ron Popeil TV pitches), Terry Price, Elliot Nachbar, Tom McNally did mornings and others.  In 1973, the station moved its offices and studios (along with its AM sister-station, WOND) from Pleasantville to Linwood, NJ, and changed format to TM's automated "beautiful music" called "Your Beautiful Island" with a new SMC Automation System and then switched to TM's "Stereo Rock" and the name "Rock 104" on August 31, 1976. Current songs were back announced by John Borders "and before that ...".  

From 1980 to 1982, Rock 104 went live with "McNally in the Morning" with Program Director/Chief Engineer Tommy "Tom" McNally, and then all of a sudden WMGM FM went 100% live in November 1982 with Mike Boyle, music director Mark DiDia, Russell "Russ" Egan, Karen "K.C." Chamberlain, Eric Johnson, Jim Spector, Rona Richman, Johnny Russell, Al Horner, Tom Sappie, Patrick DeMarco, Kathy Knoll, Al Branca, with Marlon Barrow, and Donna Richards. WMGM FM's power was officially increased to 50,000 watts in 1985 with a higher tower, but management declares that "Rock 104 WMGM" was a thing of the past and it was time to evolve, so the station was renamed "104/MGM" in 1986.

On October 5, 1987, WMGM-FM was switched into a CHR/CR hybrid format, with Little Lies by Fleetwood Mac as their first song after the switch. As their new switch takes place, new jocks joined WMGM including Ellis B. "Bruce The Bear" Feaster, John and Ken, and "The Mudman", the station went fully fledged CHR as "104/MGM, The Hottest Hits" A short time later, in August 1991, WMGM became "Sunny 104," with an adult contemporary format, which evolved into a 1970s format by 1995, with "Classic Hits 103.7" being used by February 1997.

In February 2000, WMGM became "103.7 The Shark" with a classic rock format.

Both Barbara "Barb" Larue and Sean Patrick have been in the market for 10+ years on several rock stations.

On August 17, 2011, The Shark became "103.7 WMGM Rocks" with a Mainstream Rock format. The station's on-air staff includes Matt Murray, Sean Patrick, Moon, April, and Lauren.

External links 
Official website

MGM
Linwood, New Jersey
Pleasantville, New Jersey
Mainstream rock radio stations in the United States
Active rock radio stations in the United States